Joseph Allen Willard (April 26, 1803, in Hubbardton, Rutland County, Vermont – August 18, 1868, in Lowville, Lewis County, New York) was an American politician from New York.

Life
He was the son of Francis Willard (c. 1777–1856), a carpenter. Joseph A. Willard became a clothier, and about 1824 set up shop in Lowville. On October 22, 1829, he married Eusebia Eager (1818–1887), and they had several children.

He entered politics as a Whig, was a delegate to the Anti-Nebraska Party state convention in 1854, and joined the Republican Party upon its foundation. He became a brigadier general of the State Militia, and was Supervisor of the Town of Lowville in 1856 and 1857.

Willard was a member of the New York State Senate (18th D.) in 1858 and 1859.

Ancestry 
Joseph Allen Willard was a 3rd great-grandson (6th generation descendant) of the Massachusetts colonist Simon Willard (1605–1676).

Bibliography

Annotations

Notes

References 

  ; .

  ; .
<li>
<li>

1803 births
1868 deaths
Republican Party New York (state) state senators
People from Lowville, New York
People from Hubbardton, Vermont
Town supervisors in New York (state)
19th-century American politicians